Dr. Baba Saheb Ambedkar Medical College and Hospital, established in 2016, is a full-fledged tertiary Medical college at Sector 6, Rohini in Delhi, India. The college imparts the degree of Bachelor of Medicine and Surgery (MBBS). The college is recognized by National Medical Commission and is affiliated with the Guru Gobind Singh Indraprastha University. The selection to the college is done on the basis of merit through National Eligibility and Entrance Test. This college is associated with the 540 bedded Dr. Baba Saheb Ambedkar Hospital.

Courses
Dr. Baba Saheb Ambedkar Medical College and Hospital undertakes the education and training of students in MBBS courses.

References

External links 
https://bsamch.ac.in/

Medical colleges in Delhi
Educational institutions established in 2016
Hospitals in Delhi